Enrique Alonso Aguilar Borrego (10 December 1948 – 14 June 2009) was a Mexican trade unionist and politician from the Institutional Revolutionary Party. From 2000 to 2003 he served as Deputy of the LVIII Legislature of the Mexican Congress representing Sinaloa.

References

1948 births
2009 deaths
People from Culiacán
Politicians from Sinaloa
Mexican trade unionists
Institutional Revolutionary Party politicians
21st-century Mexican politicians
National Autonomous University of Mexico alumni
Deputies of the LVIII Legislature of Mexico
Members of the Chamber of Deputies (Mexico) for Sinaloa